("Give Me That") "Old-Time Religion" (and similar spellings) is a traditional Gospel song dating from 1873, when it was included in a list of Jubilee songs—or earlier. It has become a standard in many Protestant hymnals, though it says nothing about Jesus or the gospel, and covered by many artists. Some scholars, such as Forrest Mason McCann, have asserted the possibility of an earlier stage of evolution of the song, in that "the tune may go back to English folk origins" (later dying out in the white repertoire but staying alive in the work songs of African Americans). In any event, it was by way of Charles Davis Tillman that the song had incalculable influence on the confluence of black spiritual and white gospel song traditions in forming the genre now known as southern gospel.  Tillman was largely responsible for publishing the song into the repertoire of white audiences. It was first heard sung by African-Americans and written down by Tillman when he attended a camp meeting in Lexington, South Carolina in 1889.

Lyrics
Most common lyrics performed are a repetition of the chorus:

The lyrics, however, as sung by the Fisk Jubilee Singers are:

Following Tillman's nuanced changes that accommodated the song more toward the tastes of white southern church congregations, Elmer Leon Jorgenson and other editors preferred the more-formalized first line "'Tis the old-time religion" (likewise the repeated first line of the refrain).

In popular culture

 The SATB musical arrangement popularized in the hymnals published by Charles Davis Tillman is the background song in the 1941 film Sergeant York. It is featured prominently in the film Inherit the Wind. It also appears in Russ Meyer's penultimate movie Beneath the Valley of the Ultra-Vixens and in HBO's Carnivàle.
 British folk busking duo The Brotherhood (Don Partridge and Pat Keene) recorded a lively version of this song on their 1966 album "Singin' 'n' Sole-In" 
 This song is referenced in Captain Beefheart's song "Moonlight on Vermont" on his 1969 album Trout Mask Replica. Numerous parodic filk verses for "Old-Time Religion" exist, some of the earliest of which were composed by Gordon R. Dickson and made famous by Arlo Guthrie and Pete Seeger in live performances and on their live album Precious Friend. The parody verses make reference to a very wide range of "old-time religions" that most Christians would consider pagan.
 "The Song With Five Names", by Will Wood and the Tapeworms on their 2016 album "Self-Ish" uses the first verse of Old-Time Religion, modifying the last line to "It's good enough/But not enough/To be good enough for me".
 Bob Dylan makes reference to the song in his song Goodbye Jimmy Reed from his 2020 album Rough and Rowdy Ways.

See also
Charles Davis Tillman
Old-time music

References

Bibliography
Pike, G. D. The Jubilee Singers and Their Campaign for Twenty Thousand Dollars. Nashville: Lee and Shepard, 1873.

American folk songs
Gospel songs
1873 songs
1873 in Christianity
Pace Jubilee Singers songs